Leucophysalis is a genus of flowering plants belonging to the family Solanaceae.

Its native range is Canada to Western and Northern USA.

Species:

Leucophysalis grandiflora 
Leucophysalis nana

References

Solanaceae
Solanaceae genera